Laurence (Greek: Λαυρέντιος, died 166) was the bishop of Byzantium for eleven years and six months (154–166 AD). He succeeded Bishop Euzois. He was in office during the rule of Antoninus Pius and Marcus Aurelius. His successor was Alypius.

Sources
 www.ec-patr.org

2nd-century Romans
2nd-century Byzantine bishops
Bishops of Byzantium
166 deaths
Year of birth unknown